"Lovergirl" is a song by American singer Teena Marie from her sixth studio album, Starchild (1984). Written, composed and produced by Marie, the song was released as the lead single from Starchild in October 1984. It was Marie's first hit single under her new label, Epic, after a lawsuit with Motown. "Lovergirl" also became Marie's biggest hit, peaking at number four on the US Billboard Hot 100.

Awards and accolades 
Marie received a Grammy Award nomination for Best Female R&B Vocal Performance for "Lovergirl" at the 28th Annual Grammy Awards–her second nomination in that category. The award was won by Aretha Franklin's "Freeway of Love".

Music video 
The accompanying music video for "Lovergirl" was directed by actress Cicely Tyson.

Charts

Chart positions

References 

1984 singles
Teena Marie songs
1984 songs
Epic Records singles
American dance-pop songs